Liang dynasty (502–557), also known as Southern Liang, was an imperial dynasty during the Southern and Northern Dynasties period.

Liang dynasty may also refer to:
 Former Liang (320–376), one of the Sixteen Kingdoms
 Later Liang (Sixteen Kingdoms) (386–403), one of the Sixteen Kingdoms
 Southern Liang (Sixteen Kingdoms) (397–414), one of the Sixteen Kingdoms
 Northern Liang (397–439), one of the Sixteen Kingdoms
 Western Liang (Sixteen Kingdoms) (400–421), one of the Sixteen Kingdoms
 Western Liang (555–587), a puppet state during the Northern and Southern dynasties period
 Later Liang (Five Dynasties) (907–923), one of the five dynasties that ruled northern China successively during the Five Dynasties and Ten Kingdoms period

See also
 Liang (state) (8th century BC – 641 BC), a state during the Spring and Autumn period
 Wei (state) (403 BC – 225  BC), also known as Liang after moving its capital in 4th century BC
 Liang (disambiguation)